Arnaud Démare (born 26 August 1991) is a professional road racing cyclist who currently rides for UCI WorldTeam . In 2011 he won the UCI World Under-23 Road Race Championships, and in 2016 he won the Milan–San Remo. He is one of five riders to have won the French National Road Race Championships three times, having won the race in 2014, 2017 and 2020.

Career

2012 season

In August 2012, Démare won the first World Tour race of his career by prevailing in the Vattenfall Cyclassics, ahead of local favorite André Greipel and Giacomo Nizzolo. Démare clearly dominated the mass sprint contested in scorching heat at the end of the  race. That year, he also participated in the Olympic road race, finishing 30th.

2013 season
In 2013, Démare won 3 stages in a row at the Four Days of Dunkirk and the general classification. On the third stage, his team-mate and lead-out rider Geoffrey Soupe produced a final power surge to launch Démare, and the duo finished one-two in the mass sprint, with Ramon Sinkeldam of  taking third place.

2014 season
Démare won the Four Days of Dunkirk stage race for the second year in succession, winning two stages during the event. He also won the points and young rider classifications. He also put in some strong performances in the cobbled classics, finishing second in Gent–Wevelgem and twelfth in Paris–Roubaix.

2015 season

Démare struggled for form for much of the 2015 season, only scoring one top ten finish in the spring classics with a tenth place in Omloop Het Nieuwsblad. He did however manage to score two stage wins in the Tour of Belgium.

2016 season
In January 2016 Démare announced his race plans for the first half of the new season, starting his campaign on home soil at the Étoile de Bessèges and Tour Méditerranéen, followed by competing in the cobbled classics of Omloop Het Nieuwsblad, Kuurne–Brussels–Kuurne, Milan–San Remo, Gent–Wevelgem, Tour of Flanders and Paris–Roubaix, along with the stage races Paris–Nice and the Three Days of De Panne. He also announced that he would skip the Tour de France and focus on the Giro d'Italia instead. He enjoyed success at the Tour Méditerranéen, where his FDJ squad won the race's opening team time trial and he won the following stage. Démare went on win the first full stage of Paris–Nice and then took the biggest win of his career at the Milan–San Remo. However, in the absence of any photographic or video evidence, race officials decided not to take any action. Démare became the first Frenchman to win the Milan-San Remo since Laurent Jalabert in 1995. He was also the first Frenchman to win a Monument race since 1997, when Jalabert and Frédéric Guesdon had won the Giro di Lombardia and Paris–Roubaix respectively.

2017 season

On 4 July, two days after finishing Stage 2 in second position behind Marcel Kittel, Démare clinched his first Tour de France or Grand Tour stage win by winning the Tour de France's fourth stage that ended in a hectic sprint into Vittel; it was the first stage victory by a Frenchman in a bunch sprint since Jimmy Casper won Stage 1 that started and ended in Strasbourg in 2006. In Stage 6, Démare was edged out again into a second-place finish by Marcel Kittel, who launched a perfectly timed late sprint with around 200 metres to go. Démare was ill during the mountainous Stage 8 and fell back very early. Two teammates were with him to try and bring him in within the time limit. He eventually finished in 188th position, 37 minutes and 33 seconds behind the Stage 8 winner. Démare, who was sitting in second position in the points classification at the start of the Stage 9, finished that challenging mountain stage in a group around 40 minutes behind the Stage 9 winner. That put him outside the time limit, and therefore out of the Tour de France, along with six other riders.

2018 season
After finishing second to Dylan Groenewegen at Kuurne–Brussels–Kuurne, Démare took his first victory of the season with an opening-day stage win at Paris–Nice. He took third-place finishes on consecutive March weekends at Milan–San Remo and Gent–Wevelgem, but it was not until June before he took another victory, winning the penultimate stage of the Tour de Suisse. At the Tour de France, he was third on the second and thirteenth stages, before he took his second Tour de France stage win, on stage eighteen into Pau, following a lead-out from teammate Jacopo Guarnieri. With a further third-place finish on the final stage, Démare finished third in the points classification. He was second at the EuroEyes Cyclassics, before he completed a clean sweep at the Tour Poitou-Charentes en Nouvelle-Aquitaine, winning all five stages on his way to the overall victory.

2019 season

Démare's first victory of the 2019 season came during the tenth stage of the Giro d'Italia, which ended on the streets of Modena, prevailing in a bunch sprint ahead of Elia Viviani. He took the lead of the points classification the following day, which he held for seven stages, but ultimately finished second to Pascal Ackermann – a rider he had criticised following his Modena stage victory. He then won two stages and the points classification at the Route d'Occitanie, and also won a stage at the Tour de Wallonie. Démare's final win of the season came at September's Okolo Slovenska, where he won the penultimate stage and the points classification; he finished second overall, one second in arrears of race winner Yves Lampaert.

2020 season
After competing at the UAE Tour prior to the COVID-19 pandemic-enforced suspension of racing, Démare's first win of 2020 came at Milano–Torino, which was held on a flatter parcours compared to previous years, as it was held as a midweek precursor to Milan–San Remo three days later. Over the rest of August, Démare took eight further victories – two stage wins and the general classification at the Tour de Wallonie, the French National Road Race Championships (becoming the fifth rider to win the race at least three times), and three stage wins and the general classification at the Tour Poitou-Charentes en Nouvelle-Aquitaine, overhauling Josef Černý on the final day in the latter. He also won a silver medal in the road race at the UEC European Road Championships, held in Plouay, France, just behind Italy's Giacomo Nizzolo.

After a stage win in September's Tour de Luxembourg, Démare returned to the Giro d'Italia in October, as one of the contenders for the points classification jersey. Démare won his first stage of the race on stage four, winning a bunch sprint into Villafranca Tirrena. Démare then won the next two bunch sprints on stages six and seven into Matera and Brindisi respectively, taking and solidifying his lead in the points classification, and as a result, becoming the first rider since Robbie McEwen in 2006 to win three stages in the opening week of the Giro d'Italia. He added a fourth stage victory on stage eleven into Rimini, again in a bunch sprint, and ultimately held the points classification lead until the finish in Milan; he finished 49 points ahead of his closest challenger, Peter Sagan. Démare finished the 2020 season with fourteen victories, two more than any other rider.

2021 season
Démare took his first win of the season in April at the one-day race, La Roue Tourangelle, beating Nacer Bouhanni in a sprint finish. He then won two stages and the points classification in the Volta a la Comunitat Valenciana, and in May, won the last three stages of the Boucles de la Mayenne on his way to winning the general and points classifications at the race. He won the second stage of the Route d'Occitanie, before competing in the Tour de France for the first time since 2018. Démare recorded a single top-ten stage finish (fourth) on stage six, and finished outside of the time limit three stages later, ending his race early. He made his first start at the Vuelta a España, looking to complete the triptych of winning a stage at all three Grand Tours. The closest he came was a second-place finish to Fabio Jakobsen on the fourth stage, and he finished inside the top-100 of a Grand Tour general classification for the first time. He finished the season with a second-place finish at Paris–Bourges, and victory in Paris–Tours, winning out of a four-rider group that had broken clear towards the end of the race. He became the first French rider to win the race for fifteen years.

2022 season
Early in the season Demare finished in 10th place in both Milan-San Remo and Gent Wevelgem. During the 2022 Giro d'Italia he rode very strongly winning three stages as well as the points classification. His victory on stage 13 of the Giro was the 10th grand tour stage win of his career.

Major results

2008
 Tour de l'Abitibi
1st  Points classification
1st Stage 1
 1st Stage 4 Coupe des Nations Abitibi
 9th Bernaudeau Junior
2009
 2nd  Road race, UCI Junior World Championships
 2nd Paris–Roubaix Juniors
 3rd  Road race, UEC European Junior Road Championships
 3rd Overall Tour d'Istrie
1st Stage 3
 3rd Bernaudeau Junior
 6th Overall GP Général Patton
 9th Overall Tour De Lorraine Juniors
2010
 1st Grand Prix de la ville de Pérenchies
 1st Stage 4 Coupe des nations Ville Saguenay
 5th Road race, UCI Under-23 Road World Championships
 8th La Côte Picarde
 9th Paris–Tours Espoirs
 10th ZLM Tour
 10th Grand Prix de la Ville de Lillers
2011
 1st  Road race, UCI Under-23 Road World Championships
 1st La Côte Picarde
 1st Ronde Pévéloise
 Coupe des nations Ville Saguenay
1st Stages 1 & 4
 1st Stage 3 Tour Alsace
 4th Paris–Roubaix Espoirs
 4th ZLM Tour
2012
 1st Vattenfall Cyclassics
 1st Le Samyn
 1st Cholet-Pays de Loire
 1st Stage 6 Tour of Qatar
 1st Stage 2 Route du Sud
 2nd Road race, National Road Championships
 2nd Halle–Ingooigem
 4th Kuurne–Brussels–Kuurne
 4th Tro-Bro Léon
 4th GP de Denain Porte du Hainaut
 9th Overall Driedaagse van West-Vlaanderen
1st  Points classification
1st Stage 2
2013
 1st  Overall Four Days of Dunkirk
1st  Points classification
1st  Young rider classification
1st Stages 1, 2 & 3
 1st Grand Prix de Denain
 1st RideLondon–Surrey Classic
 1st Grand Prix d'Isbergues
 1st Grote Prijs Beeckman-De Caluwé
 1st Stage 4 Tour de Suisse
 1st Stage 2 Eneco Tour
 2nd Paris–Bourges
 3rd Paris–Tours
 9th Overall Tour de l'Eurométropole
 9th Omloop van het Houtland
 10th Vattenfall Cyclassics
2014
 1st  Road race, National Road Championships
 1st  Overall Four Days of Dunkirk
1st  Points classification
1st  Young rider classification
1st Stages 1 & 2
 1st  Overall Tour de l'Eurométropole
1st  Points classification
1st  Young rider classification
1st Stages 1, 2 & 4
 1st  Overall Tour de Picardie
1st  Points classification
1st Stages 2 & 3
 1st Halle–Ingooigem
 1st Kampioenschap van Vlaanderen
 1st Grand Prix d'Isbergues
 1st Stage 6 Tour of Qatar
 2nd Gent–Wevelgem
 3rd Brussels Cycling Classic
 10th Omloop Het Nieuwsblad
2015
 Tour of Belgium
1st Stages 2 & 3
 4th Paris–Bourges
 4th Tour de Vendée
 6th Vattenfall Cyclassics
 10th Omloop Het Nieuwsblad
2016
 1st Milan–San Remo
 1st Binche–Chimay–Binche
 La Méditerranéenne
1st Stages 1 (TTT) & 2
 1st Stage 1 Paris–Nice
 Route du Sud
1st  Points classification
1st Stage 5
 2nd Paris–Tours
 2nd Brussels Cycling Classic
 5th Gent–Wevelgem
 6th Grand Prix de Fourmies
 8th Halle–Ingooigem
2017
 1st  Road race, National Road Championships
 1st Brussels Cycling Classic
 1st Grand Prix de Denain
 1st Halle–Ingooigem
 Tour de France
1st Stage 4
Held  after Stages 4–6
 Critérium du Dauphiné
1st  Points classification
1st Stage 2
 Étoile de Bessèges
1st Stages 1 & 4
 1st Stage 1 Paris–Nice
 1st Stage 2 Four Days of Dunkirk
 2nd EuroEyes Cyclassics
 6th Kuurne–Brussels–Kuurne
 6th Milan–San Remo
 6th Paris–Roubaix
 7th Tro-Bro Léon
2018
 1st  Overall Tour Poitou-Charentes en Nouvelle-Aquitaine
1st  Points classification
1st Stages 1, 2, 3, 4 (ITT) & 5
 1st Stage 18 Tour de France
 1st Stage 1 Paris–Nice
 1st Stage 8 Tour de Suisse
 2nd EuroEyes Cyclassics
 2nd Kuurne–Brussels–Kuurne
 2nd Grand Prix de Fourmies
 3rd Milan–San Remo
 3rd Gent–Wevelgem
 9th Omloop Het Nieuwsblad
2019
 Giro d'Italia
1st Stage 10
Held  after Stages 11–17
 Route d'Occitanie
1st  Points classification
1st Stages 2 & 4
 1st Stage 4 Tour de Wallonie
 2nd Overall Okolo Slovenska
1st  Points classification
1st Stage 3
 4th Paris–Tours
 6th Brussels Cycling Classic
 6th Paris–Chauny
 8th EuroEyes Cyclassics
 9th Road race, UEC European Road Championships
2020
 1st  Road race, National Road Championships
 1st  Overall Tour Poitou-Charentes en Nouvelle-Aquitaine
1st  Points classification
1st Stages 1, 2 & 5
 1st  Overall Tour de Wallonie
1st  Points classification
1st Stages 2 & 4
 1st Milano–Torino
 Giro d'Italia
1st  Points classification
1st Stages 4, 6, 7 & 11
 1st Stage 2 Tour de Luxembourg
 2nd  Road race, UEC European Road Championships
 5th Paris–Chauny
2021
 1st  Overall Boucles de la Mayenne
1st  Points classification
1st Stages 2, 3 & 4
 1st Paris–Tours
 1st La Roue Tourangelle
 Volta a la Comunitat Valenciana
1st  Points classification
1st Stages 2 & 5
 1st Stage 2 Route d'Occitanie
 2nd Paris–Bourges
 5th Grand Prix d'Isbergues
 6th Grand Prix de Denain
2022
 1st Paris–Tours
 1st Grand Prix d'Isbergues
 Giro d'Italia
1st  Points classification
1st Stages 5, 6 & 13
 Tour de Pologne
1st  Points classification
1st Stage 7
 1st Stage 1 Route d'Occitanie
 2nd  Road race, UEC European Road Championships
 2nd Primus Classic
 2nd Egmont Cycling Race
 2nd Druivenkoers Overijse
 2nd Paris–Bourges
 6th Classic Brugge–De Panne
 7th Paris–Chauny
 10th Milan–San Remo
 10th Gent–Wevelgem

Grand Tour general classification results timeline

Classics results timeline

Major championships timeline

References

External links

 

1991 births
Living people
Cyclists at the 2012 Summer Olympics
French male cyclists
French Tour de France stage winners
French Giro d'Italia stage winners
Olympic cyclists of France
Sportspeople from Beauvais
Tour de Suisse stage winners
Cyclists from Hauts-de-France
20th-century French people
21st-century French people